June Green may refer to:

 June Green (swimmer) (born 1959), British swimmer
 June Lazenby Green (1914–2001), United States district judge